Unique Sweets is an American television series on Cooking Channel about various eating establishments across the United States and their signature or most popular desserts. The series features interviews with guest pastry chefs and food critics who give commentary about their favorite dessert dishes. Each episode features a different restaurant, bakery or specialty sweet shop, focusing on one theme, such as ice-cream, cakes or pies.

Regular cast
The Unique Sweets cast is made up of food industry professionals; such as pastry chefs, bakers, cookbook authors, cooking show hosts and food writers who all describe their favorite desserts at eating establishments featured in each episode.

List of episodes

Season 1 (2011)

Season 2 (2011-2012)

Season 3 (2012-2013)

Season 4 (2013-2014)

Season 5 (2014)

Season 6 (2015)

Season 7 (2016)

References

External links 
 
 
 

Cooking Channel original programming
2011 American television series debuts